The 2018–19 Belmont Bruins women's basketball team represents Belmont University during the 2018–19 NCAA Division I women's basketball season. The Bruins, led by second year head coach Bart Brooks, play their home games at the Curb Event Center as members of the Ohio Valley Conference (OVC). They finished the season 26–7, 16–2 in OVC play win the OVC regular season. They won the OVC women's tournament by defeating UT Martin and earns an automatic trip to the NCAA women's tournament where they lost to South Carolina in the first round.

Roster

Schedule and results

|-
!colspan=9 style=| Non–conference regular season

|-
!colspan=9 style=| Ohio Valley Conference regular season

|-
!colspan=9 style=| Ohio Valley Conference tournament

|-
!colspan=9 style=| NCAA Women's Tournament

Rankings
2018–19 NCAA Division I women's basketball rankings

See also
2018–19 Belmont Bruins men's basketball team

References

Belmont Bruins women's basketball seasons
Belmont Bruins
Belmont
Belmont Bruins women's basketball
Belmont Bruins women's basketball